Bonneauville is a borough in Adams County, Pennsylvania. The population was 1,758 at the 2020 census.

Geography
Bonneauville is located at  (39.811513, -77.136537).

Demographics

As of the census of 2000, there were 1,378 people, 494 households, and 383 families residing in the borough. The population density was 1,387.8 people per square mile (537.4/km²). There were 514 housing units at an average density of 517.6 per square mile (200.5/km²). The racial makeup of the borough was 95.72% White, 1.31% African American, 0.36% Asian, 1.52% from other races, and 1.09% from two or more races. Hispanic or Latino of any race were 3.12% of the population.

There were 494 households, out of which 40.3% had children under the age of 18 living with them, 61.7% were married couples living together, 12.3% had a female householder with no husband present, and 22.3% were non-families. 17.4% of all households were made up of individuals, and 5.7% had someone living alone who was 65 years of age or older. The average household size was 2.79 and the average family size was 3.13.

In the borough, the population was spread out, with 29.3% under the age of 18, 8.3% from 18 to 24, 32.7% from 25 to 44, 20.2% from 45 to 64, and 9.6% who were 65 years of age or older. The median age was 33 years. For every 100 females there were 94.1 males. For every 100 females age 18 and over, there were 89.5 males.

The median income for a household in the borough was $40,221, and the median income for a family was $42,955. Males had a median income of $31,350 versus $20,804 for females. The per capita income for the borough was $15,720. About 9.5% of families and 13.0% of the population were below the poverty line, including 22.4% of those under age 18 and 13.0% of those age 65 or over.

History
The town's name prior to its 1961 incorporation was "Bonnaughtown" (alternate spelling "Bonnoughtown"), a German name consistent with the area's history of German immigration. The original name appears in journals of officers and soldiers who passed through the town during the Gettysburg Campaign of the Civil War.

References

External links

1961 establishments in Pennsylvania
Boroughs in Adams County, Pennsylvania
Populated places established in 1755